The 1922 All-Ireland Senior Football Championship was the 36th staging of Ireland's premier Gaelic football knock-out competition. Dublin were the winners.

Results

Connacht Senior Football Championship

An objection was made and a replay ordered.

Galway made an objection and a replay was ordered.

Leinster Senior Football Championship

Munster Senior Football Championship

Ulster Senior Football Championship

All-Ireland Senior Football Championship
By the time the semi-final was to be played, the Connacht championship was not finished, so Sligo were nominated to represent Connacht. When Galway beat Sligo in the Connacht final, they were given Sligo's place in the All-Ireland semi-final. Sligo beat Galway in the Connacht final, then beat Tipperary in the semi-final, but Galway objected to Sligo's Connacht final victory and a replay was ordered. A depleted Sligo team lost to Galway, who then took Sligo's place in the final against Dublin.

Championship statistics

Miscellaneous
 Most games were delayed and effected by the War of Independence.
 Last Connacht final that was played at Croke Park. Dublin until 2021.

References